This is a list of episodes for Fast N' Loud Season 15. Season 15 started on July 8, 2019.

References 

2019 American television seasons